The Nineties: A Book is a 2022 book by Chuck Klosterman. It is an analysis of historical trends and pop culture phenomena in the decade of the 1990s. It was released February 8, 2022, by Penguin Books.

References

2022 non-fiction books
Popular culture books
Penguin Books books